Malm is a surname. Notable people with the surname include:

August Wilhelm Malm (1821–1882), Swedish biologist
Andreas Malm (born 1976/1977), Swedish author and professor of human ecology
Carl Oscar Malm (1826–1863), Finnish teacher of the deaf and father of Finnish Sign Language
Edward Malm (1899–1983), Swedish Army lieutenant general
Esko Malm (born 1940), Finnish footballer and football manager
Mona Malm (1935–2021), Swedish film, stage, and television actress
Niina Malm, Finnish politician
Peter Malm (1800–1868), Finnish ship owner
Otto Malm (1838–1898), Finnish shipowner (son of Peter Malm)